Clinostomum is a genus of trematodes in the order Diplostomida.

Species
Species include:
Clinostomum abdoni Tubangui & Garcia, 1939
Clinostomum africanum Stossich, 1906
Clinostomum album Rosser, Alberson, Woodyard, Cunningham, Pote & Griffin, 2017
Clinostomum almaziae Meskal, 1970
Clinostomum anusi Wesley, 1944
Clinostomum arquus Sereno-Uribe, García-Varela, Pinacho-Pinacho & Pérez-Ponce de León, 2018
Clinostomum attenuatum Cort, 1913
Clinostomum australiense Johnston, 1917
Clinostomum awadhi Abro, Dharejo, Khan & Birmani, 2016
Clinostomum caffarae Sereno-Uribe, García-Varela, Pinacho-Pinacho & Pérez-Ponce de León, 2018
Clinostomum chabaudi Vercammen-Grandjean, 1960
Clinostomum chrysichthys Dubois, 1930
Clinostomum cichlidorum Sereno-Uribe, García-Varela, Pinacho-Pinacho & Pérez-Ponce de León, 2018
Clinostomum complanatum (Rudolphi, 1814) Braun, 1899
Clinostomum cutaneum Paperna, 1964
Clinostomum dalagi Tubangui, 1933
Clinostomum dasi Bhalerao, 1942
Clinostomum deccanum Jaiswal, 1957
Clinostomum demiegrettae Jaiswal, 1957
Clinostomum detruncatum Braun, 1899
Clinostomum dubium Leidy, 1856
Clinostomum falsatum Ortlepp, 1963
Clinostomum fergalliarii Montes, Barneche, Pagano, Ferrari, Martorelli & Pérez-Ponce de León, 2021
Clinostomum foliiforme Braun, 1899
Clinostomum gideoni Bhalerao, 1942
Clinostomum giganticum Agarwal, 1959
Clinostomum golvani Nassi & Bayssade-Dufour, 1980
Clinostomum gracile Leidy, 1856
Clinostomum heluans Braun, 1899
Clinostomum hornum Nicoll, 1914
Clinostomum hyderabadensis Jaiswal, 1957
Clinostomum hylaranae Fischthal & Thomas, 1968
Clinostomum kalappahi Bhalerao, 1947
Clinostomum kassimovi Vaidova & Feizullaev, 1958
Clinostomum lambitans Braun, 1899
Clinostomum lophophallum Baer, 1933
Clinostomum lucknowensis Pandey, 1969
Clinostomum macrosomum Jaiswal, 1957
Clinostomum magadhatum Singh & Prasad, 1980
Clinostomum marginatum (Rudolphi, 1819) Braun, 1899
Clinostomum mastacembeli Jaiswal, 1957
Clinostomum orientale Mukherjee, 1968
Clinostomum philippinensis Velasquez, 1960
Clinostomum piscidium Southwell & Prashad, 1918
Clinostomum poteae Rosser, Baumgartner, Alberson, Noto, Woodyard, King, Wise & Griffin, 2018
Clinostomum prashadi Bhalerao, 1942
Clinostomum progonum Jaiswal, 1957
Clinostomum pseudoheterostomum Tubangui, 1933
Clinostomum pusillum Lutz, 1928
Clinostomum pyriforme Prudhoe, 1957
Clinostomum schizothoraxi Kaw, 1950
Clinostomum sindensis Khan & Bilqees, 1986
Clinostomum sinense Locke, Caffara, Barčák, Sonko, Tedesco, Fioravanti & Li, 2019
Clinostomum singhi Jaiswal, 1957
Clinostomum tataxumui Sereno-Uribe, Pinacho-Pinacho, García-Varela & Pérez-Ponce de León, 2013
Clinostomum tilapiae Ukoli, 1966
Clinostomum trichogasteri Pandey, 1969
Clinostomum ukolii Caffara, Locke, Echi, Halajian, Luus-Powell, Benini, Tedesco & Fioravanti, 2020
Clinostomum vanderhorsti Ortlepp, 1935
Clinostomum wilsoni Matthews & Cribb, 1998

References

Diplostomida
Animal families